Elena Votsi (Greek: Έλενα Βότση; born 1964 on Hydra island) is a Greek jewelry designer.

Votsi completed a degree at the School of Fine Arts in Athens in painting, followed by a master's degree at the Royal College of Art in London in jewelry.

In 2003 she won the competition to re-design the Summer Olympic Games medal for the International Olympic Committee, the first time the medal had been changed since 1928. Votsi's design was adopted by the International Olympic Committee for all future Summer Olympic Games medals.

Her handmade 18-karat gold ring with diamonds won the 2009 Couture Design Award in the category "Best in the New-to-Couture," a category for first-time exhibitors at the Las Vegas show.

References

External links 
 
Olympic Museum page on Athens 2004 medals
Article in International Jewellery

Living people
1964 births
20th-century Greek women artists
21st-century Greek women artists
Alumni of the Royal College of Art
Greek jewelry designers
Greek designers
People from Hydra (island)